Royal Dano-Norwegian Navy order of battle in Norway in 1808

Following the loss of the Danish-Norwegian fleet at the Battle of Copenhagen in 1807 and of the last ship-of-the line, Prinds Christian Frederick, at Zealand Point in March 1808, Denmark-Norway were forced to adopt the method of defence later known as the Gunboat War.  Lacking the time and resources to build a new battle fleet, they concentrated on smaller craft capable of carrying heavy, long range cannon  viz. gunboats that were effective in the calmer, narrower inshore waters, but could not challenge enemy warships in rougher seas.
For the rougher waters of the Norwegian Sea from 1808 onward, a new class of gunship, the seaworthy 50-man pine-built Norske Kanonskonnert were to be built in Bergen and Trondheim.  Ten such gunships were constructed before 1814, and more after Norway achieved independence from Denmark.

List of Dano-Norwegian naval forces in Norway in 1808 after the capture of the British brig  on 19 June 1808.

Command structure

Hr. Generaladjutant, Kommander Lorenz Fisker.

Stationen ved Hvaløerne og Grændsen (Hvaler Islands and the border with Sweden at the mouth of the Oslofjord)
First Division Kanonchalupper (Larger Gunboats) commanded by Kapteinløitnant S. Bille.
Second Division Kanonchalupper commanded by Senior Lieutenant J. N. Müller.
First Division Kanonjoller (Smaller gunboats) commanded by Senior Lieutenant G Hagerup
Second Division Kanonjoller commanded by Junior Lieutenant J J Lund

Stationen ved Fredriksværn:
(Western side of the Oslofjord, near Stavern) 
Commander: Senior Lieutenant Hensler.

Stationen ved Langesund:
(Western side of the Oslofjord, opposite Hvaler)
Commander: Senior Lieutenant H. D. B. Seidelin.

Stationen ved Øster-Risøer:
(Western side of the Oslofjord, south of Langesund)
Commander: Junior Lieutenant F. W. Løvenskiold.

Stationen ved Arendal:
(Western side of the Oslofjord, south of Øster-Risøer)
Commander: Senior Lieutenant G. G. Dietrichson.

Stationen ved Christianssand:
(Kristiansand, near southern tip of Norway)
Commander: Captain M. Bille.

Stationen ved Mandal;
(At the southern tip of Norway)
Commander: Senior Lieutenant P. C. Spørck.

Stationen ved Stavanger:
Commander: Junior Lieutenant J. C. Grove.

Stationen i Bergen:
Commander: Senior Lieutenant Kammerjunker J. C. A. Bjelke.

Stationen i Trondhjem:
Commander: Captain F. C. Motzfeldt.

Vessels
Lougen: brig armed with 18 × short 18-pounder and 2 × long 6-pounder cannon
Officers: Kapteinløitnant P. F. Wulff, Sekondløitnant Wiegelsen, Sekondløitnant Schmidten, and MaanedsløitnantLund.
: brig armed with 16 × short  18-pounder and 2 × long 6-pounder cannon
Officers: Premierløitnant O. C. Budde, Sekondløitnant Havn, Maanedsløitnant Troy, and Maanedsløitnant Obelitz.
Hemnæs: schooner brig armed with 12 × 24-pounder carronades and 2 × long 6-pounder cannon
Officers: Maanedsløitnant Wahrendorff, Maanedsløitnant R. Knap.
Fortroendet: defence ship armed with 16 × short 18-pounder cannons and 2 × 24-pounder carronades
Officers: Premierløitnant Dorn, Kadet-Maanedsløitnant Findt, and Maanedsløitnant Harris.
Friherrinde Fredrikke Lovise: defence ship armed similarly to Fortroendet above
Officers: Premierløitnant Conrad Grove, Kadet-Maanedsløitnant Hesselberg, and Maanedsløitnant	Leth.
Birgitha: defence ship armed with 14 × short 18-pounder and 2 × long 6-pounder cannons
Officers: Premierløitnant C. Rasch, Kadet-Maanedsløitnant Ryberg, and Maanedsløitnant	Parnemann.
Prinds Christian til Slesvig-Holsten: defence ship armed with 16 × short 18-pounder  and 2 × long 6-pounder cannons
Officers: Premierløitnant Jochum Lund, Kadet-Maanedsløitnant N. Grove, and Maanedsløitnant Vauvert.

Gunboats

Larger Gun Boats (named in list, by station) - Kanonchalupper usually armed with 2 x 24-pounder cannon and 4 x 4-pounder howitzers
Arendal 2; 
Fredriksværn 5 (plus one under construction); 
Langesund 1; 
Kristiansand 6 (plus two under construction); 
Hvaløerne 11; 
Mandal 1; 
Bergen 2; 
Trondheim (4 under construction)

Smaller Gun Boats (named in list, by station)  - Kanonjolle each with one 24 pound cannon
Arendal 2; 
Frederiksværn 6 (two with two 4lb howitzers in addition); 
Langesund 4; 
Stavanger 2 (plus one very small gunboat armed with one 8lb cannon); 
Øster-Risøer 4; 
Kristiansand 7; 
Hvaløerne 13; 
Mandal 2; 
Bergen  5 (plus three under construction); 
Trondheim (4 under construction)

Batteries
Fixed Coastal Batteries:
Slevigs Batteri on the eastern side of the entrance to Christiana (Oslo) fjord.
14 x 18lb cannon.
Lieutenant in the land forces v. Lemvig, in command.

Vallø Saltverks defence works near Tønsberg on the western side of Oslo fjord
10 x 24lb cannon, 3 x 18lb cannon, 4 x 6lb cannon, 2 x 4lb cannon
Acting Lieutenant V. Lerche, in command.

Svelvigens Batterier
(probably near Svelvik, closer to Oslo)	
22 x 12lb cannon, 12 x 3 or 4lb cannon
Kapteinløitnant van Deurs, in command.

Sandvigens Batteri near Arendal
12 x 12lb cannon
Head of the Coastguard Division Lind, in command.

Flekkerø Batteri on the approaches to Kristiansand
4 x 24lb cannon. (Occupied and defended in the event of enemy action with manpower from the gunboat flotilla.)

Also, much closer in to Kristiansand, Christiansholm Fortress which saw action in 1807 shortly after the Battle of Copenhagen, repelling a putative attack on HDMS Prinds Christian Frederik by HMS Spencer

Floating Batteries
Frederiksværn: one armed 10 x 24lb cannon, 2 x 18lbs cannon, 2 x 12lbs howitzers, 1 x 4lbs howitzer
Kristiansand: Three armed variously: 8 x 24lb Cannon; 6 x 24lb cannon; 6 x 18lb cannon).

Notes

References

Danish Sources
T. A. Topsøe-Jensen og Emil Marquard (1935) “Officerer i den dansk-norske Søetat 1660-1814 og den danske Søetat 1814-1932“. Two volumes. (Danish Naval Officers) Download here.
Fra Krigens Tid (From the wartime 1807-1814) edited by N A Larsen, Christiana 1878 (Index Page)

Royal Dano-Norwegian Navy
Napoleonic Wars orders of battle
19th century in Norway